Pokhara University (PU or PoU) was established in 1997 (2054 B.S.) and is Nepal's fifth university. Its central office is located in Pokhara, Kaski District, Gandaki Province. Along with Purbanchal University, PU was formed as part of a government initiative to improve access to higher education. The Prime Minister of Nepal is the university chancellor and the Minister of Education is the pro-chancellor. The vice chancellor is the principal administrator of the university.

Location

Pokhara University is located in Khudi-Dhungepatan, Pokhara Lekhnath Municipality, Kaski District, 13 km east of Pokhara city (Prithvi Chowk). It also operates an academic complex in Seven Lake City, Lekhnath, surrounded by several peaks of the Himalayan mountain range. Begnas Lake and Rupa Lake are within walking distance of the university's central office.

The School of Engineering, The School of Health & Allied Sciences, The School of Business, and The School of Development and Social Engineering are housed in buildings located on the bank of the Khudi river.

Academic offerings 
Pokhara University began offering degrees following the Pokhara University Act of 1997.

Pokhara University has four Constituent Schools where Bachelor's, Master's, and PhD degree programs are offered. There are 57 academic institutions affiliated with PU, also offering Bachelor's, Master's, M.Phil. and PhD. degree programs.

Teaching
The university uses a semester system. All bachelor's degrees are four years (delivered over eight semesters) and master's degrees are an additional two years (delivered over an additional four semesters). The Philosophy degree requires one and a half years (three semesters) of study. All programs are carried out in English.

There are four faculties:
 Faculty of Sciences and Technology
 Faculty of Management Studies
 Faculty of Humanities and Social Sciences
 Faculty of Health Sciences

Partners
Pokhara University has signed memoranda of understanding (MoU) with the following Nepalese and international institutions:
 Ball State University (Indiana, USA) [entered on 8 March 2000]
 Showa Pharmaceutical University (Tokyo, Japan) [entered on 8 November 2001]
 Institute of Oriental Medicine, Dongguk University (Kyungpook, South Korea) [entered on 14 November 2001]
 Institute of Natural Medicine, Toyama Medical and Pharmaceutical University (Toyama, Japan) [entered on 24 December 2001]
 University of Roorkee (presently Indian Institute of Technology) (Roorkee, India) [entered on 13 October 2002]
 National University Corporation Ehime University (Japan) [entered on 28 May 2006]
 Independent University (Bangladesh) [entered on 14 August 2007]
 Graduate School of Pharmaceutical Sciences, Faculty of Medical and Pharmaceutical Sciences, Kumamoto University (Kumamoto, Japan) [entered in 2007]
 Bodo University College (Norway) [entered on 11 August 2008]
 Punjab University (Chandigarh, India) [entered on 19 February 2009]
 Sun Moon University Korea and the College of Law of Sun Moon University (South Korea) [entered on 19 November 2009]
 Asian Institute of Technology (Bangkok, Thailand) [entered on 10 December 2009]
 University of Tromsø (Norway) [entered on 5 January 2010]
 Institute of Foreign Trade and Management (UP, India) [entered on 18 January 2010]
 KIIT University (Bhubaneswar, India) [entered on 3 February 2010]
 Information Technology Research Institute, BK21 U-Business Service Model and Platform Research Team, and Information System Sector in Graduate School of Business IT, Kookmin University (Seoul, South Korea) [entered on 25 February 2010]
 Jilin University (China) [entered on 14 March 2010]
 IUBAT-International University of Business Agriculture and Technology (Dhaka, Bangladesh) [entered on 6 July 2010]
 Kingston University (United Kingdom)
 Yonsei Biomolecule Research Initiative (BK21), Yonsei University (South Korea)
 Central Queensland University (Australia)
 University of Sains (Penang, Malaysia)
 Hanoi University of Science (Hanoi, Vietnam)
 Kumamoto University (Japan)
 Sepuluh Nopember Institute of Technology (Surabaya, Indonesia)
 University Under Forum for Integrated Development of Eleventh University (FIND - 11) (Indonesia)
 Sichuan University (People's Republic of China)
 Institute of Business Management (Pakistan)
 College of Engineering, Pukyong National University (Busan, South Korea)
 University of Science and Technology Beijing (People's Republic of China)
 University of Warsaw (Poland)
 Università degli Studi di Roma Tor Vergata (Italy)
 Padova University (Italy)
 National Information Society Agency (South Korea)

Joint constituent colleges
Madan Bhandari Memorial Academy Nepal, Urlabari, Morang (School Of Engineering)
B.P. Koirala Memorial Cancer Hospital Nursing College, Chitwan, Nepal
Himalaya Eye Institute, Kaski, Nepal
Tilganga Institute of Ophthalmology, Kathmandu, Nepal

Constituent colleges
School of Business
School of Health and Allied Sciences (Formerly, School of Pharmaceutical and Biomedical Sciences)
School of Engineering
School of Development and Social Engineering

Engineering colleges
School of Engineering, Dhungepatan, Kaski, Nepal
Madan Bhandari Memorial Academy Nepal, Urlabari, Morang (School of Engineering)
Nepal Engineering College, Bhaktapur, Nepal
Nepal College of Information Technology, Lalitpur, Nepal
Everest Engineering and Management College, Kathmandu, Nepal
Cosmos College of Management and Technology, Lalitpur, Nepal
Universal Engineering & Science College, Lalitpur, Nepal
Gandaki College of Engineering and Science, Kaski, Nepal
Pokhara Engineering College, Kaski, Nepal
Oxford College of Engineering and Management, Nawalpur, Nepal
United Technical College, Chitwan, Nepal
Lumbini Engineering College, Rupandehi, Nepal
Ritz College of Engineering & Management, Balkumari, Lalitpur
National Academy of Science and Technology, Kailali, Nepal
Rapti Engineering College, Dang, Nepal
College of Engineering & Management, Banke, Nepal

Other affiliated colleges
 Excel Business College, Baneshwor Kathmandu
 United Technical College, Bhojad, Chitwan
 Victoria International College
 Rapti Engineering College, Ghorai, Dang
 Atharva Business College, Bansbari, Maharajgunj, Kathmandu, Nepal
 Pokhara University School of Engineering, Dhungepatan Kaski Nepal
 Shahid Ramnath Dahal Memorial College (MRM), Balaju, Kathmandu
 Ace Institute of Management (AIM), New Baneshwor, Kathmandu
 Apex College, Baneshwor, Kathmandu
 Brihaspati College, Siddharthanagar-5, Rupandehi
 College of Computer Technology, Devinagar, Butwal-13, Rupandehi
 Cosmos College of Management & Technology, Tutepani, Lalitpur
 Everest Engineering College (EEC), Sanepa, Lalitpur
Nepal Engineering College (NEC), Changunarayan, Bhaktapur
Oxford college of engineering and management, (OCEM) Gaidakot, Nawalparasi
Gandaki College of Engineering and Science, Lamachour, Pokhara
 Institute of Advance Communication, Education & Research, Baneshwor, Ktm.
Lumbini Engineering College, Butwal, Rupandehi.
National Academy of Science & Technology, Dhangadhi
National Open College (NOC) Sanepa, Lalitpur
Nepal College of Computer Studies, Gaindakot-2, Nawalparasi
Nepal College of Information Technology (NCIT), Balkumari, Lalitpur
Nepal Engineering College (NEC), Changunarayan, Bhaktapur
Nepal Tourism & Hotel Management College, Chinnedanda, Pokhara
Nobel College, Sinamangal, Kathmandu
Pokhara College of Management Studies, New Road, Pokhara
Pokhara Engineering College (PEC) Phirke-8, Pokhara
Pokhara College of Technology (currently known as  LA GRANDEE International College (LGIC)), Simalchour-8, Pokhara
School of Environmental Management & Sustainable Development (SchEMS) 62/38 Siddhicharan Marg Shantinagar, New Baneshwor
Tilottama Campus Yogikuti, Butwal, Rupandehi
South Asian Institute of Management (SAIM), Patan, Lalitpur
Universal Science College (USC) Maitidevi, Kathmandu.
V.S. Niketan College, Min Bhawan, Kathmandu
Camad College, Sukedhara, Kathmandu
Ritz College of Hospitality and Management, Balkumari, Lalitpur
Nepal Western Management and Engineering College, Dhangadhi Kailali
Boston International College, Bharatpur-9, Hakim Chowk, Chitwan
Liberty College, Anamnagar, Kathmandu
Citizen College, Kumaripati, Lalitpur
Central COllege, Sinamgal, Kathmandu

Scholarship
As the largest scholarship-providing university in Nepal, Pokhara University provides scholarships to 10 percent of approved students in affiliated colleges and 20 percent of approved students in constituent schools. Graduates from either government or non-government schools or colleges are eligible to apply for scholarships and other financial support.

Up until 2017, any students who passed the SLC test in government schools were eligible to receive scholarships; however, starting in 2021, students who have graduated from class 6 through 10 at a government school are given priority. Any remaining scholarships are then distributed to students who graduated from class 10 at a government school. Students from non-government schools can also apply, but it is nearly impossible for them to receive a scholarship under this new scheme.

The PU Scholarship Selection Examination determines eligibility to receive scholarships based on applicants' entrance scores and other credentials.

References

External links
 
 School of Business

 
1996 establishments in Nepal
Educational institutions established in 1996
Universities and colleges in Nepal
Education in Pokhara